Belliqueux was a 64-gun ship of the line of the French Navy, launched in 1756.

She was found by Antelope anchored off Ilfracombe, Antelope opened fire but the French ship surrendered without having fired a shot in return. The crew of 500 was captured.She was taken into the Royal Navy and commissioned as the third rate HMS Belliqueux.

The captains were:
 from November 1758: captain , in the West Indies (quit due to ill health)
 from late 1761: captain Richard Edwards, in the Mediterranean.

Belliqueux was broken up in September 1772.

See also
List of ships captured in the 18th century

Notes

References

Lavery, Brian (2003) The Ship of the Line – Volume 1: The development of the battlefleet 1650–1850. Conway Maritime Press. .
Michael Phillips (2007). Belliqueux (64) (1758). Michael Phillips' Ships of the Old Navy. Retrieved 2009-06-15.

Belliqueux (1756)
Ships of the line of the Royal Navy
1756 ships
Captured ships